Manor High School is a public high school located in Portsmouth, Virginia. In 1993, Manor’s original building was renamed Woodrow Wilson High School after it merged three schools until July 2021. It is administered by Portsmouth City Public Schools. The school colors are red, black and white, and the nickname is the Mustangs.

History 
Manor can be traced back to 1885, when a high school was organized at The Academy on Glasgow Street, which had housed only grammar and elementary students from 1850 through 1884. The first high school class graduated that same year. In 1886 the Glasgow Street building was no longer suitable, so the city erected a new building on Green Street, known as the Green Street School. High school, grammar, and elementary students moved there from the Glasgow Street location in September 1886.

In 1888, Portsmouth High School was formally established but continued to be housed in the Green Street building. Portsmouth High School moved to a brand new building on Washington Street in 1909. The new facility was the first one planned for the exclusive use of the high school.

In September 1919, Portsmouth High School was renamed Woodrow Wilson High School and moved to a new building on High Street. The vacated building became an elementary school called Washington Street School, and later F.T. Briggs School. In September 1955, Woodrow Wilson High School moved again to a new facility on Willett Drive, and the vacated building on High Street became Harry Hunt Junior High School. In September 1993, Woodrow Wilson was merged with Cradock High School and Manor High School. To appease alumni, the Woodrow Wilson name was kept, though the three schools were merged into the Manor building, which opened in 1972.

The school, along with others in the area, has recently become noted for its high dropout rates. The school has made news headlines for school shooting, gang activity, mace spray use in school fights, sexual contact between a recruiter and a student, threats made to the school, and the school's students being murdered off school grounds.

In 2020, residents initiated the petition to abolish the use of Wilson's name and change the name to Manor. On December 3, 2020, the Portsmouth School Board, responding to calls to remove Woodrow Wilson's name from the school, voted 8 - 1 to restore the name Manor High School, effective July 1, 2021.

Notable alumni 
V. C. Andrews – author
Marty Brennaman – sportscaster for the Cincinnati Reds
Karen Briggs – violinist
Mahlon Clark – jazz musician
LaTasha Colander – track and field sprint star, 2000 Olympic Gold Medalist
Mark Steven Davis -  Chief United States district judge of the United States District Court for the Eastern District of Virginia.
Bill Deal – beach music musician with group Bill Deal and the Rhondels
Missy Elliott – rapper
Perry Ellis – fashion designer
Chandler Harper, golfer
Ben Jones – actor and politician
T. J. Jordan – basketball player
LaShawn Merritt – sprinter, 2008 Olympic Gold medalist (400 meters and  relay)
Bill Moran – Former Major League Baseball player
Clarence "Ace" Parker, Pro Football Hall of Famer and Former MLB player 
Bill Schneider – journalist with CNN
Aaron Sparrow, American football player
Jurij Toplak, constitutional scholar, university professor and election law expert
Khadijah Whittington  Former WNBA basketball player

References

External links

 

Schools in Portsmouth, Virginia
Educational institutions established in 1888
Public high schools in Virginia
1888 establishments in Virginia